Sabafon was the first GSM Network operator in Yemen, launched in February 2001.

Sabafon Logo and Slogan
Slogan:  "أصالة و تواصل", (Arabic slogan, pronounced: SABAFON ... Hamzatulwasl) meaning SABAFON... the link.

Management
The company organization is represented by, Sheikh Hamdan Al-Ahmar - the chairman of the company and other management and executive staff (CEO Mr. Fahed Al-Ariqy, HR Mr Ahmed Barasheed, Technical Director eng. Abdulhadi Al Zawari , Sales Director Mr Gawhar Nasher and marketing Director Mr. Walid Akkaoui, CFO, Mr Ali Naji, IT Director Mr Iskander Saeed etc.).

Shareholders

SabaFon consists of five main partners.

The main partners are:

Al-Ahmar Group
A well known local holding entity possessing numerous companies in various fields of business activities in Yemen. Their companies vary from Bank, Oil, Power, Agencies, Franchise, Telecommunications, Fish, Airlines, Travel, Shoes, Cloths, and Food and Beverages. 

Key Personnel: 
Hamdan Al-Ahmar   - Chairman of the Board

Batelco
Is Bahrain’s leading Telecommunication Company. Serving both the corporate and consumer markets in the most liberalized and competitive market in the Middle East, Batelco sells telecommunications in Bahrain and MENA. 

With significant operations in Bahrain, Jordan, Kuwait and Egypt, the Batelco Group provides voice and data services over fixed, wireless, and internet platforms, systems integration and enterprise solutions to Government and Corporate clients.

Hayel Saeed Anam & Co. Ltd.
Hayel Saeed Anam & Co. Ltd. is A local well known group, which provides a variety of services through their Industrial, Commercial, Agriculture, Fishery, Animal wealth, Hotels, Health, Banks, and Insurance Companies.

Consolidated Constructors International company S.A.L. (CCC)
One of the leading international construction companies worldwide, CCC has multiple infrastructure investments in Yemen and around the world.

Network information

The company declare it covers 68% of Yemen's population and will continue its hard efforts to roll out into new places and regions in Yemen.
The Existing Network includes: 

 Switches: Siemens (EWSD) Version SR9
 Radio Base station: Siemens Motorola 
 Billing System: Protek 
 Microwave Equipment: Siemens Nokia 
 Operating frequency: 900 MHz

The planned network (2008 Plan) includes:

 Switches: Siemens, NSN
 Radio Base station: Siemens NSN Huawei 
 Billing System: Protek 
 Microwave Equipment: Siemens Nokia 
 Operating frequency: 900 MHz, 1800 MHz

See also
 Yemen Mobile
 MTN Group
 YemenSoft

External links
 Sabafon home page

Mobile phone companies of Yemen